Michael Lang Moorehouse (May 28, 1925 – February 4, 1998) was an American film actor. He was known for playing the role of "Sgt. Manfredi" in the 1953 film Stalag 17.

Moore was born in Boston, Massachusetts. He began his career in 1943, first appearing in the film We've Never Been Licked, where he played the uncredited role of a student. He then played the role of "Bill Taff" in the 1951 film Silver City, after Moore came back into acting. Moore starred in the 1952 film The Atomic City, where he played the role of "Russ Farley", in which he starred with Gene Barry, Lydia Clarke, Nancy Gates and Lee Aaker.

Moore played the role of "Robert Clayton" in the 1953 film Jamaica Run. He also played the role of "Rance Hastings" in the film Pony Express. Moore appeared in films such as Little Boy Lost and The Desperate Hours and television programs such as Death Valley Days and The Adventures of Rin Tin Tin. He played the role of Sgt. Klinger in the 1953 film Sabre Jet. In the same year, Moore played the role of Sgt. Manfredi in Stalag 17, and the film was nominated for three Academy Awards.

Moore played the role of Roy in the 1954 film Alaska Seas. He retired in 1956, and his last credit was from the film The Ten Commandments.

Filmography

References

External links

Rotten Tomatoes profile

1925 births
1998 deaths
People from Boston
Male actors from Boston
American male film actors
20th-century American male actors